Edward Gaming (EDG) is a professional esports organization based in Shanghai, China.

EDG's League of Legends team, officially called EDG Hycan, competes in the League of Legends Pro League (LPL) and plays home games at the Shanghai Electric Industrial Park. It is the only LPL team to have won both the Mid-Season Invitational and the World Championship, in 2015 and 2021 respectively.

History

2014 
Edward Gaming (EDG) first entered the professional League of Legends scene in September 2013. EDG secured a spot in the 2014 LPL Spring Split by acquiring the slot of LMQ, which had left to compete in the 2014 NA Challenger Series. EDG's first acquisitions were Jie and former Positive Energy AD carry NaMei, who both signed with the team on 10 February. Soon after on 12 February, they acquired former World Elite players ClearLove and fzzf as their jungler and support, as well as Koro1 as their top laner.

On 29 April, EDG placed first at the 2014 International Esports Tournament in Yiwu, Zhejiang.

EDG gained a reputation as a "super team", emerging as the champions of the 2014 LPL Spring Split on 25 May.

They continued to perform well into the 2014 LPL Summer Split, finishing in first place in both the regular season and playoffs. In the finals of the playoffs on 24 August, they defeated OMG in the LPL Spring Final on 24 August. In addition to their LPL success, EDG also found success in other events, finishing top two at every major tournament they competed in. EDG won the 2014 China Regional Finals on 7 September, securing the first seed from China at the 2014 World Championship. However, EDG underperformed at the World Championship. The team tied for second in their group with ahq e-Sports Club and ended up losing to fellow LPL team Star Horn Royal Club 2–3 in the first round of playoffs.

On 12 September, EDG won the X Championship Season I. On 26 October, EDG placed first at the 2014 NVIDIA Game Festival. On 2 November, EDG finished in second place at the 2014 National Electronic Sports Tournament (NEST 2014). Samsung Galaxy Blue AD carry Deft announced on 11 November that he had joined EDG. On 2 December, mid laner  PawN joined EDG from Samsung Galaxy White. EDG won the 2014 National Electronic Sports Open, defeating LGD Gaming in the finals on 7 December. On 13 December, they placed first at Demacia Cup Season 2. On 17 December, Azure, now known as Meiko, joined the team.

On 28 December, EDG placed first at G-League 2014.

2015 
 

On 4 January, NaMei left the team and joined Star Horn Royal Club. On 15 January, the day before the beginning of the 2015 LPL Spring Split, fzzf announced his retirement. He was replaced temporarily by Mouse, who played with the team at the G-League 2014 Finals, and in the first two weeks of the LPL Spring Split.

On 16 January, EDG started a Hearthstone division with lvxiaobu, yutian and longshi.

From week three of the split, Meiko played as the team's support. On 26 April, Reapered joined as a coach. EDG finished first in the 2015 LPL Spring Playoffs, defeating LGD 3–2 in the finals. EDG's LPL Spring title qualified them for the inaugural Mid-Season Invitational.

EDward Gaming beat SK Telecom T1 in the finals of the 2015 Mid-Season Invitational and were crowned as the tournament's inaugural champions.

At the 2015 World Championship, EDG lost in the quarterfinals to the European team Fnatic 0–3.

2016 
In January 2016, EDG's Counter-Strike: Global Offensive division was established.

In January 2016, in the 2015 GHL Storm Hero Gold Finals, EDG lost to eStar 2–4 and finished runners-up. In June 2016, EDG E-sports Club officially announced the suspension of the Storm Hero Project.

On 23 April 2016, in the 2016 LPL Spring Final, EDG lost to Royal Never Give Up (RNG) 1–3 and finished runners-up.

EDG qualified for the 2016 LPL Summer Playoffs thanks to their placement in the regular season. EDG lost to RNG 0–3 in the 2015 LPL Summer Final and received the second seed for the LPL at the 2016 World Championship.

EDG tied with AHQ after the group stage, and the former qualified for the quarterfinals after beating the latter in a tiebreaker match. On 16 October 2016, EDG lost to South Korean team ROX Tigers 1–3 in the quarterfinals and was eliminated from the tournament. In the Demacia Cup held in December 2016, EDG defeated RNG 3–1 and advanced to the finals. In the final, EDG defeated the I May and set a record of five consecutive tournament championships by an LPL team.

2017 
In April 2017, EDG lost to RNG 1–3 in the LPL Spring Playoffs semifinals and followed up with a 3–2 victory over OMG, finishing third. In the LPL Summer Split, the EDG defeated Invictus Gaming (IG) in the second round of playoffs to advance to the finals. In the final, EDG defeated RNG to win their fifth LPL title and qualify for the 2017 World Championship. EDG was eliminated from the 2017 World Championship after failing to place top two in their group, ending with a 2–4 record.

In 2017, the club officially established EDG.M as its mobile division and acquired the original 2016 World Cyber Games champion roster. In the Kings Glory Champions Cup, EDG lost 2–4 to the Qiao Gu Reapers in the quarterfinals.

In July 2017, EDG and Tyloo announced their new strategic partnership, stating that they would jointly train new players and help cultivate CS:GO talent in China. In November, the two teams created a jointly-owned PlayerUnknown's Battlegrounds team.

On 31 October 2017, EDG and Lyon Esports announced their joint venture to establish "Lyon China" to compete in FIFA Online 3 esports tournaments.

2018 
On 7 January 2018, EDG won the Demacia Cup Winter with a 3–1 victory over Snake Esports.

In the 2018 LPL Spring Split, EDG advanced to the playoffs after finishing first in the regular season, defeating Rogue Warriors before losing to RNG in the finals and finishing runners-up.

On 4 May 2018, EDG announced the completion of a nearly ¥100 million Pre-A round of financing, with the joint lead investor being the China Idol Entertainment Industry Fund, which is dominated by Capital and CIC Zhongcai.

2020 
EDG placed sixth in the regular season of the 2020 LPL Spring Split with a record of 9 wins and 7 losses. In the first round of the playoffs, they defeated RNG and advanced to the second round. In the second round, they lost 1–3 to FunPlus Phoenix (FPX). EDG placed ninth in the regular season of the 2020 LPL Summer Split with a record of 8 wins and 8 losses and failed to qualify for the playoffs; the team's worst domestic performance to date.

2021 
EDG won the 2021 World Championship, and became the first team to do so while playing three full best-of-five series.

2022 
During the 2022 League of Legends World Championship, Edward Gaming finished 5-8th after losing 2-3 to DRX, becoming the second team in World Championship history to be reverse swept at the event.

Roster

Honours

Domestic

League
 League of Legends Pro League (LPL)
Winners (6): 2014 Spring, 2014 Summer, 2015 Spring, 2016 Summer, 2017 Summer, 2021 Summer

Cup
 Demacia Cup
Winners (5): 2014 Season 2, 2015 Spring, 2015 Summer, 2016 Season, Championship 2017 Season

International
Mid-Season Invitational
Winners (1): 2015
League of Legends World Championship
Winners (1): 2021

Notes

References

External links 

 EDward Gaming on Weibo

2013 establishments in China
Companies based in Shanghai
Esports teams based in China
Hearthstone teams
Heroes of the Storm teams
League of Legends Pro League teams
Sports teams in Shanghai
Esports teams established in 2013
Counter-Strike teams